This article provides information on candidates who stood for the 1984 Australian federal election. The election was held on 1 December 1984.

Redistributions and seat changes
Due to the expansion of the House, redistributions occurred in all states.
In New South Wales, the National-held seat of Paterson was abolished and the National-held seat of Riverina was renamed Riverina-Darling. Nine new seats were created: the notionally Labor seats of Charlton, Dobell, Fowler, Gilmore, Greenway, Lindsay and Throsby; and the notionally National seats of Page and Parkes.
The member for Chifley, Russ Gorman (Labor), contested Greenway.
The member for Cowper, Ian Robinson (National), contested Page.
The member for Farrer, Wal Fife (Liberal), contested Hume.
The member for Hunter, Bob Brown (Labor), contested Charlton.
The member for Macarthur, Colin Hollis (Labor), contested Throsby.
The member for Macquarie, Ross Free (Labor), contested Lindsay.
The member for Riverina, Noel Hicks (National), contested Riverina-Darling.
In Victoria, the Liberal-held seat of Balaclava was renamed Goldstein and the Labor-held Diamond Valley was abolished. Seven new seats were created: the notionally Labor seats of Aston, Calwell, Dunkley, Jagajaga, McEwen and Streeton; and the notionally Liberal seat of Menzies. The Labor-held seat of Casey became notionally Liberal.
The member for Balaclava, Ian Macphee (Liberal), contested Goldstein.
The member for Burke, Andrew Theophanous (Labor), contested Calwell.
The member for Deakin, John Saunderson (Labor), contested Aston.
The member for Diamond Valley, Peter Staples (Labor), contested Jagajaga.
The member for Flinders, Bob Chynoweth (Labor), contested Dunkley.
In Queensland, the National-held seat of Darling Downs was renamed Groom. Five new seats were created: the notionally Labor seats of Forde, Hinkler and Rankin; the notionally Liberal seat of Moncrieff; and the notionally National seat of Fairfax. The Labor-held seat of Fadden became notionally Liberal.
The member for Darling Downs, Tom McVeigh (National), contested Groom.
The member for Fadden, David Beddall (Labor), contested Rankin.
The member for Fisher, Evan Adermann (National), contested Fairfax.
Queensland Senator Kathy Martin (Liberal) contested Moncrieff.
In Western Australia, the notionally Labor seats of Brand and Cowan were created. The Labor-held seat of Tangney became notionally Liberal.
The member for Canning, Wendy Fatin (Labor), contested Brand.
The member for Tangney, George Gear (Labor), contested Canning.
In South Australia, the notionally Labor seat of Makin and the notionally Liberal seat of Mayo were created.
In Tasmania, the Liberal-held seat of Wilmot was renamed Lyons. The sitting member, Max Burr, contested Lyons.

Retiring Members and Senators

Labor
 Doug Everingham MP (Capricornia, Qld)
 Ken Fry MP (Fraser, ACT)
 Bill Morrison MP (St George, NSW)
Senator Jean Hearn (Tas)
Senator Cyril Primmer (Vic)

Liberal
 Ray Groom MP (Braddon, Tas)
 Kevin Newman MP (Bass, Tas)
Senator Misha Lajovic (NSW)

National
 Frank O'Keefe MP (Paterson, NSW)
Senator Douglas Scott (NSW)

House of Representatives
Sitting members at the time of the election are shown in bold text. Successful candidates are highlighted in the relevant colour. Where there is possible confusion, an asterisk (*) is also used.

Australian Capital Territory

New South Wales

Northern Territory

Queensland

South Australia

Tasmania

Victoria

Western Australia

Senate
Sitting Senators are shown in bold text. The Senate was expanded at this election so that each state was represented by twelve senators instead of ten. As such, each state elected seven senators, six to serve a six-year term and one to serve a three-year term. Tickets that elected at least one Senator are highlighted in the relevant colour. Successful candidates are identified by an asterisk (*).

Australian Capital Territory
Two seats were up for election. The Labor Party was defending one seat. The Liberal Party was defending one seat.

New South Wales
Seven seats were up for election. The Labor Party was defending two seats. The Liberal-National Coalition was defending two seats. The Australian Democrats were defending one seat. Two seats were newly created. Senators Peter Baume (Liberal), Sir John Carrick (Liberal), Arthur Gietzelt (Labor), Doug McClelland (Labor) and Graham Richardson (Labor) were not up for re-election.

Northern Territory
Two seats were up for election. The Labor Party was defending one seat. The Country Liberal Party was defending one seat.

Queensland
Seven seats were up for election. The Labor Party was defending two seats. The Liberal Party was defending one seat. The National Party was defending one seat. The Australian Democrats were defending one seat. Two seats were newly created. Senators Florence Bjelke-Petersen (National), Stan Collard (National), Mal Colston (Labor), George Georges (Labor) and Warwick Parer (Liberal) were not up for re-election.

South Australia
Seven seats were up for election. The Labor Party was defending three seats. The Liberal Party was defending two seats. Two seats were newly created. Senators Ron Elstob (Labor), Dominic Foreman (Labor), Janine Haines (Democrats), Robert Hill (Liberal) and Tony Messner (Liberal) were not up for re-election.

Tasmania
Seven seats were up for election. The Labor Party was defending two seats. The Liberal Party was defending three seats. Two seats were newly created. Senators Don Grimes (Labor), Brian Harradine (Independent), Peter Rae (Liberal), Michael Tate (Labor) and Shirley Walters (Liberal) were not up for re-election.

Victoria
Seven seats were up for election. The Labor Party was defending three seats. The Liberal Party was defending two seats. Two seats were newly created. Senators John Button (Labor), Don Chipp (Democrats), Gareth Evans (Labor), Dame Margaret Guilfoyle (Liberal) and Austin Lewis (Liberal) were not up for re-election.

Western Australia
Seven seats were up for election. The Labor Party was defending two seats. The Liberal Party was defending two seats. The Australian Democrats were defending one seat. Two seats were newly created. Senators Fred Chaney (Liberal), Ruth Coleman (Labor), Peter Durack (Liberal), Gordon McIntosh (Labor) and Peter Walsh (Labor) were not up for re-election.

Summary by party 

Beside each party is the number of seats contested by that party in the House of Representatives for each state, as well as an indication of whether the party contested the Senate election in the respective state.

See also
 1984 Australian federal election
 Members of the Australian House of Representatives, 1983–1984
 Members of the Australian House of Representatives, 1984–1987
 Members of the Australian Senate, 1983–1985
 Members of the Australian Senate, 1985–1987
 List of political parties in Australia

References
Adam Carr's Election Archive - House of Representatives 1984
Adam Carr's Election Archive - Senate 1984

1984 in Australia
Candidates for Australian federal elections